Jaime Zapata (26 November 1957) is an Ecuadorian painter. He graduated from the Art Faculty of the School of Plastic Arts at the Universidad Central de Quito in 1972.

Zapata is known for his artistic depictions of women.  he lives and works in Paris, France.

References

External links
Official Website

1957 births
Living people